Hurricane Shary was a short-lived tropical cyclone that stayed over the open waters of the North Atlantic in late October 2010. The eighteenth named storm and eleventh hurricane of the unusually active 2010 Atlantic hurricane season, Shary originated from a weak area of convection over the Central Atlantic and became a tropical storm on October 28. Initially not expected to exceed wind speeds of 50 mph (85 km/h), Shary defied predictions and became a minimal hurricane on October 30, passing well east of Bermuda. Unfavorable conditions subsequently impacted the storm, and Shary quickly began to lose tropical characteristics. Later that day, Shary degenerated into a post-tropical cyclone, and the final advisory by the National Hurricane Center was issued.

The storm brushed Bermuda with light rain, and wind gusts reached no more than 35 mph (55 km/h) as it made its closest point of approach to the territory.

Meteorological history 

In late October 2010, the National Hurricane Center (NHC) began to monitor a weak area of disorganized weather along the southern periphery of a frontal system, associated with a broad surface trough east-northeast of Puerto Rico. Supported by an upper-level low retrograding to its southwest, the system generated clusters of scattered showers and isolated thunderstorms, otherwise known as convection. The activity gradually enhanced as environmental conditions within its encounter became more favorable over time. Around 1200 UTC October 28, satellite imagery showed what appeared to be the formation of a surface low within the trough. Shower and thunderstorm activity accordingly intensified, and the NHC assessed a high chance for tropical or subtropical development. At the time, the center of circulation remained poor; however, it became better defined later that day, with a stable amount of corresponding convection. Although the upper low had remained adjacent, it was located well to the southwest of the system's small wind radius, an atypical structure for a subtropical cyclone. The system was therefore operationally designated as Tropical Storm Shary at 0000 UTC October 29, though post-season analysis revealed a tropical depression had formed by 1800 UTC October 28, about 520 mi (830 km) south-southeast of Bermuda. At the time of classification, the agency noted that Shary would be a relatively short-lived tropical cyclone due to a merge with a cold front forecast to occur within the following 48 hours.

Steered northwestward between the upper low and a mid-level ridge to its northeast, Shary's cloud pattern became less distorted as it continued to separate itself from the upper low. Although the center remained partially exposed, convection steadily deepened within the western semicircle over the course of the next morning. However, as the upper low dropped to the south, northerly shear increased over the system, shifting the inner-core convection south of the center. Following a significant decrease in Shary's forward speed, dry air began to wrap into the eastern and northeastern quadrants of the storm, resulting in some convective erosion. As the upper low retained little to no further influence, the storm re-curved to the north, expected to restrengthen only slightly in response to marginally improving conditions aloft. However, several forecast models showed Shary becoming a hurricane within 36 hours, which at the time the NHC regarded as "highly unlikely given the very strong shear and cool sea surface temperatures forecast". Nevertheless, data from a Hurricane Hunters flight revealed a drop in minimum central pressure and an increase in maximum wind speeds; convection re-fired later that day, quickly expanding over the eastern side of the cyclone. During the overnight hours, thunderstorm activity further amplified and deepened symmetrically near the center, supported by the development of a small eye feature as noted on microwave images. Although Dvorak classifications were far from supporting such an intensity, the system was upgraded to a Category 1 hurricane with winds of 75 mph (120 km/h) on October 30 — an occurrence which specialists described as a case of a small hurricane that would not have been observed before the availability of microwave satellite imagery. Upon reaching this intensity, Shary was entrenched in a deep, southwesterly mid-latitude flow, resulting in an accelerated motion toward the northeast.

Located just east of a strong cold front, the minimal hurricane continued to speed over progressively cooler waters. Shary gradually began to lose its convective symmetry, though the small eye remained distinguishable in microwave images. Within hours, rapid interaction with the front had begun to occur, suggesting the storm was entering an extratropical transition. Data from cyclone phase space diagrams indicated Shary had become post-tropical about 530 miles (885 km) south-southeast of Cape Race, and the NHC discontinued advisories. Later on that day, the extratropical remnants of Hurricane Shary were completely absorbed by the same neighboring system.

Preparations and impact 
Immediately following the first advisory on Shary on October 28, the Government of Bermuda issued a tropical storm warning for the entire island. JetBlue canceled flights from the United States to Bermuda in response to the storm. The Causeway, a low-lying bridge that connects St. David's Island to the mainland, was scheduled to shut down at 7:00 p.m. local time on October 29; several football cancellations were made as a result. Ferry service between Hamilton Parish and St. George's Island was temporarily suspended. Local officials urged residents to secure their boats as a safety precaution. The tropical storm warning was canceled during the evening of October 29, as Shary no longer posed a threat to Bermuda.

Since Shary turned away from Bermuda before directly striking the island, its effects were limited. Only  of rain fell during the storm's passage, and winds gusted to 35 mph (55 km/h).

See also 

List of Category 1 Atlantic hurricanes
List of Bermuda hurricanes
Hurricane Fay (2014)
Hurricane Nicole (2016)

References

External links 
The NHC's 
The NHC's Advisory Archive for Hurricane Shary
The NHC's Graphic Archive for Hurricane Shary

2010 Atlantic hurricane season
Category 1 Atlantic hurricanes
Hurricanes in Bermuda
2010 in Bermuda
Shary